Lukáš Lupták (born 28 July 1990) is a Slovak footballer who plays for TJ Tatran Oravské Veselé as a full back or a winger.

Club career
He made his Slovak league debut for Ružomberok against Zlaté Moravce on 14 July 2012.

In July 2018, he was signed by Spartak Trnava.

References

External links
FK Senica official club profile
MFK Ružomberok profile

1990 births
Living people
Slovak footballers
Slovak expatriate footballers
Association football midfielders
MFK Ružomberok players
FC Baník Ostrava players
1. FK Příbram players
FK Senica players
FK Fotbal Třinec players
FC Petržalka players
TJ Tatran Oravské Veselé players
Slovak Super Liga players
2. Liga (Slovakia) players
Czech First League players
Czech National Football League players
Expatriate footballers in the Czech Republic
Slovak expatriate sportspeople in the Czech Republic
Sportspeople from Ružomberok